Aonglenden Assembly Constituency is one of the 60 Legislative Assembly constituencies of Nagaland state in India. It is part of Mokokchung District and is reserved for candidates belonging to the Scheduled Tribes. It falls under Nagaland Lok Sabha constituency.

Members of Legislative Assembly

 1964: Imsumeren, Independent
 1966 (By-election): J. Maputemjen, Independent
 1969: Bendangangshi, United Front of Nagaland
 1974: Chubatoshi, United Democratic Front
 1977: S. C. Jamir, United Democratic Front
 1982: S. C. Jamir, Indian National Congress
 1987: Nungshizenba, Indian National Congress
 1989: Nungshizenba, Indian National Congress
 1993: Nungshizenba, Indian National Congress
 1998: S. C. Jamir, Indian National Congress
 2003: S. C. Jamir, Indian National Congress
 2004 (By-election): C. Apok Jamir, Indian National Congress
 2008: Nungshizenba, Indian National Congress
 2011 (By-election): Toshipokba, Nagaland People's Front
 2013: Imtikumzuk Longkumer, Indian National Congress

Election results

2018

See also
List of constituencies of the Nagaland Legislative Assembly
 Nagaland Lok Sabha constituency
 Mokokchung district

References

Assembly constituencies of Nagaland
Mokokchung district